Karl Rössler (6 May 1788, in Wiesbaden – 23 August 1863, in Hanau) was a German manufacturer and mineralogist.

After a business apprenticeship in Frankfurt am Main, he acquired in 1818 a hat factory, which he transformed into a highly successful company. He had a keen interest in the geology, mineralogy and paleontology of the Wetterau, and accordingly, collected numerous minerals and fossils of the region. During his career, he worked closely with geologist Leopold von Buch.

In 1853 he was named director of the Wetterauische Gesellschaft (Hanau), and in 1858 became a member of the Academy of Sciences Leopoldina. During the following year, he was a founding member of the Freies Deutsches Hochstift (Free German Foundation) in Frankfurt.

In 1861 the mineral rösslerite was named in his honor by Johann Reinhard Blum. The fossil snail species Turbonilla roessleri (Geinitz, 1852) also bears his name.

Publications 
 Übersicht der Wichtigsten geognostischen und oryctognostischen Vorkommnisse der Wetterau und der zunächst angrenzenden Gegenden, 1850/51 (with Gottfried Ludwig Theobald) – Overview of primary geological and mineralogical incidents in Wetterau, etc.
 Über die Petrefacten im Zechstein der Wetterau, 1851 – On petrification in the Zechstein of Wetterau.

References 

1788 births
1863 deaths
Scientists from Wiesbaden
German mineralogists
19th-century German geologists